The 2011 FIBA Americas Championship for Women was the qualifying tournament for FIBA Americas at the women's basketball tournament at the 2012 Summer Olympics in London. The tournament was held at Coliseo Álvaro Sánchez Silva in Neiva, Colombia from September 24 to October 1. It was the first FIBA Americas Championship for Women to have 10 countries competing.

Qualification
Qualification was done via FIBA Americas' sub-zones. USA Basketball chose not to enter its national team, which sat atop the FIBA World Rankings going into the tournament, because the team had already qualified for the 2012 Olympics by winning the 2010 World Championship. The qualified teams are:
South American Sub-Zone (FIBA South American Championship for Women 2010):

 (Host)

North America Sub-Zone:
 (qualified automatically)
Central American and Caribbean Zone (2010 Centrobasket for Women):
 (qualified automatically)

Draw
The draw ceremonies were held in Neiva on May 5, 2011 at the Auditorio Rodrigo Lara Bonilla de la Asamblea Departamental del Huila. The results, with the FIBA World Rankings prior to the draw, were:

Note: Colombia and Paraguay had 0 ranking points and was therefore ranked after the last ranked team.

Format
The top two teams from each group advance to the semifinals.
The winners in the knockout semifinals advance to the Final. The losers play for third place.

Tie-breaking criteria
Ties are broken via the following the criteria, with the first option used first, all the way down to the last option:
Head to head results
Goal average (not the goal difference) between the tied teams
Goal average of the tied teams for all teams in its group

Preliminary round

Group A

All times local (UTC−5)

Group B

All times local (UTC−5)

Final round

Semifinals

Third place game

Final

Awards

Statistical Leaders

Individual Tournament Highs

Points

Rebounds

Assists

Steals

Blocks

Final ranking

 Cuba renounced to compete in the World Olympic Qualifying Tournament for Women. In these circumstances, the FIBA has chosen Puerto Rico, the best team in the Americas Championship after Cuba.

See also
2011 FIBA Americas Championship

References

External links
Official Website

FIBA Women's AmeriCup
2011 in women's basketball
Bask
International women's basketball competitions hosted by Colombia
2011–12 in North American basketball
2011–12 in South American basketball